National Science Library (Abbreviated as NSL) is India's central govt owned science library, archive and repository. In June 1963, CSIR desired to establish science library to receive and retain all scientific periodicals, reports of scientific work of nation both published and unpublished.

Initially it was established in the National Physical Laboratory (NPL) building, later shifted to JNU club building temporarily.

Establishment 
In 1983, permanently four-floored centrally air-conditioned NSL building was built up in 3.5-acre plot for library and others corollary purpose, products and services at Satsang Bihar Marg, New Delhi.

Objective 
Main goals and objectives are to accomplish various types of formal and informal instruction for promoting information literacy thorough out the country as well as Identify, acquire, organize, preserve, and provide access to pertinent recorded knowledge to researchers, scientists and all users engaged in research activities.

Collection 
The NSL archived over 2,51,000 printed collection of S&T documents including monographs, bound volumes of journals, reports, theses/dissertations, standards, and patents etc. These huge collections makes a worthy R&D reference sources.

See more 
CSIR India

References 

Libraries in India
Libraries established in 1963